2gether 4ever Concert Encore Live is the Taiwanese girl group S.H.E's the 5th live album. It was released on July 10, 2015. The live album recorded the Taipei stop of their "2gether 4ever World Tour Encore". It also includes a bonus DVD of behind the scenes, and the special songs at other scenes of the tour concert.

The live album received "Top 10 Selling Mandarin Albums of the Year" in the IFPI Hong Kong Album Sales Awards 2015.

Track listing
 Opening: "The Girls" (VCR) 
 "Super Star" 
 "Can Not Wait" (迫不及待) 
 "Star Light" (星光)
 "He Still Can't Understand" (他還是不懂) 
 "Repair Me" (還我) 
 "Don't Say Sorry" (別說對不起) 
 VCR: "The First Girl" (第一個女孩) 
 "Later" (後來) 
 "The Real Me" (真的我)
 VCR: "The Second Girl" (第二個女孩) 
 "Lifelong Event" (終身大事) 
 "Fickle" (無常) 
 VCR: "The Third Girl" (第三個女孩) 
 "The Blossom of Youth" (青春是)
 "My Fondness Only You Can Be Visible" (我的溫柔只有你看得見)
 VCR: "Watching the girl on the stage" (看著台上的女孩) 
 "Fires of Heaven" (星星之火) 
 "Tropical Rainforest" (熱帶雨林) 
 "Wife" (老婆)
 "A Brand New Me" (明天的自己)
 "Moonlight in the City" (城裡的月光) 
 "Fridge" (冰箱)
 VCR: "Fighting! Girls" (戰鬥吧！女孩) 
 "Miss Universe" (宇宙小姐) 
 "Remember" 
 "Chinese" (中國話) 
 "Persian Cat" (波斯貓) 
 "Don't Wanna Grow Up" (不想長大)
 "When the Angels Sing"+"Message of Happiness"+"Magic" (天使在唱歌+幸福留言+魔力)
 VCR: "The Shining Girls" (閃閃發亮的女孩) 
 "SHERO" 
 "Love So Right" (愛就對了) 
 "Daybreak" (天亮了) 
 "The Story of Clover" (三葉草的故事) 
 "Mayday" (五月天) 
 "Where's Love" (愛呢) 
 "Blossomy" (花又開好了) 
 "Not Yet Lovers" feat. Power Station (戀人未滿 feat. 動力火車)
 "Rainbow"+"Piquancy" feat. Power Station (彩虹+痛快 feat. 動力火車) 
 "Sky" by Power Station feat. Lu Jixing (天空 by 動力火車feat.盧皆興(桑布伊)) 
 "Genesis" (美麗新世界) 
 "The Moon Represents My Heart" (月亮代表我的心)

References

S.H.E albums
HIM International Music albums
2015 video albums